Olavi Aleksanteri "Ole" Mannonen (7 March 1930 – 17 March 2019) was a Finnish modern pentathlete who competed at the 1952 and 1956 Summer Olympics. He won a bronze medal in the team event in 1952 and 1956 and an individual silver in 1956; he placed fifth individually in 1952.

Mannonen also won an individual silver at the 1955 World Championships. Domestically, he won the Finnish title in 1953 and 1956, finishing second in 1952, 1955 and 1960. He was selected as the best Finnish modern pentathlete of the year in 1952-53 and 1955-56. Since 1952 Mannonen worked at the Helsinki mounted police, becoming its head in 1971, and retiring in 1990.

References

1930 births
2019 deaths
Finnish male modern pentathletes
Olympic modern pentathletes of Finland
Modern pentathletes at the 1952 Summer Olympics
Modern pentathletes at the 1956 Summer Olympics
Olympic silver medalists for Finland
Olympic bronze medalists for Finland
Olympic medalists in modern pentathlon
World Modern Pentathlon Championships medalists
Medalists at the 1956 Summer Olympics
Medalists at the 1952 Summer Olympics